ACCF may refer to:

 American Committee for Cultural Freedom, the U.S. affiliate of the Congress for Cultural Freedom
 American College of Cardiology Foundation, a provider of medical education
 American Council for Capital Formation, a pro-business think-tank and lobbying group
 Animal Crossing: City Folk, a game for the Wii
 Assemblée de la Commission communautaire française, the local representative of the French-speaking authorities in the Brussels-Capital Region
 Assembly of Christian Churches in Fiji, an umbrella organization